Hammerschmidt is a German surname. It may also refer to:

Places
Hammerschmidt Villa, official residence of the German President
Machet die Tore weit (Hammerschmidt), advent motel
John Paul Hammerschmidt Federal Building, building in Arkansas
John Paul Hammerschmidt Lake, reservoir on the Arkansas lake

See also
Hubert Hammerschmied, Austrian cross-country skier
Hammerschlag
Hammerstein (disambiguation)